Lake Township is the name of some places in the U.S. state of Pennsylvania:

Lake Township, Luzerne County, Pennsylvania
Lake Township, Mercer County, Pennsylvania
Lake Township, Wayne County, Pennsylvania

Pennsylvania township disambiguation pages